Orchard station may refer to:

Singapore
 Orchard MRT station, a railway station in Singapore
 Orchard Boulevard MRT station, a railway station in Singapore

United States
 Orchard station (RTD), a light rail station in Denver, Colorado, U.S.
 Orchard station (VTA), a light rail station in San Jose, California, U.S.